William Sutton (born October 3, 1991) is a former American football defensive tackle. He was drafted by the Chicago Bears in the third round of the 2014 NFL Draft. He played college football at Arizona State.

As a member of the 2012 team, Sutton earned Pac-12 Defensive Player of the Year and a 2012 College Football All-America Team selection. In high school, he led the undefeated 2008 Centennial High School California Interscholastic Federation (CIF) state championship football team in quarterback sacks. He is the son of Mickey Sutton.

Early years
As a sophomore at Centennial High School in Corona, California in 2006, he totaled 11 tackles for the high school football team. Centennial finished the 2007 season with a 13–2 record and ranked 24 by USA Today. Sutton had 48 tackles for the 2007 team. The undefeated 2008 Huskies team won a CIF state championship with the help of quarterback Taylor Martinez and Vontaze Burfict. The team finished the 2008 season ranked No. 2 in the nation by USA Today. Sutton totaled 101 tackles, led the state champions with 11.5 quarterback sacks and had four blocked punts. Sutton was one of five Arizona State signees (three from class of 2008) from Centennial High School along with fellow Class of 2009 recruit Burfict.

College career
When he arrived at Arizona State, Sutton was expected to serve as a backup to returning Freshman All-American Lawrence Guy. That season, against Washington State on October 10, 2009, both of his tackles were for a loss resulting in a quarterback sack and a forced fumble as part of a 27–14 victory. The following season, he dropped , but he was ruled academically ineligible. By 2010, Arizona had six Centennial players on the roster (linebackers Burfict, Brandon Magee and Shelly Lyons, defensive linemen Will Sutton and Lee Adams and wide receiver Angelo Magee), who were dubbed the Corona Six-Pack, a reference to the municipality and Corona Beer.

In the September 8, 2012 45–14 victory against Illinois, Sutton had 8 tackles, 3 for a loss (including a quarterback sack). In the September 29, 27–17 victory against Cal, he had 8 tackles, 4 for a loss (including three quarterback sacks and a forced fumble) and earned Pac-12 Conference Defensive Player of the Week on October 1. In the following game, which resulted in a 51–17 victory against Colorado on October 11, Sutton posted 3 tackles for a loss, including 2 quarterback sacks. In the December 29, 2012 Kraft Fight Hunger Bowl against Navy, Sutton had 3.5 tackles for a loss, including 2.5 sacks.

Sutton was among the 2012 national statistical leaders in both sacks and tackles for a loss, and he helped the Arizona State defense rank among the national leaders in team sacks. He earned First Team All-Pac-12 defensive lineman recognition for the 2012 Pac-12 Conference football season by the Pac-12 head coaches as well as by CBS Sports. That season, he was named the 2012 Pac-12 Pat Tillman Defensive Player of the Year by the conference coaches as well as the conference Defensive Player of the Year by CBS Sports. He was then selected to various 2012 College Football All-America Teams, earning consensus All-American recognition. He was the fifteenth different Sun Devil and first since Thomas Weber in 2007 to earn the honor. The following organizations chose him to their first team: American Football Coaches Association,  the Associated Press, Athlon Sports, CBSSports.com, Lindy's Sports, Sporting News, Sports Illustrated. He was also chosen to the second team by FoxSportsNext.com (formerly Scout.com) and Walter Camp Football Foundation. He was also the co-winner of the Morris Trophy, by vote of the Pac-12 conference's offensive linemen.

On January 8, 2013, Sutton announced that he will return to Arizona State University to play out his senior year. For the season, he had 10.5 tackles for a loss, including 3 sacks, and repeated Pat Tillman Defensive Player of the Year and first team All-Pac-12 Team. Following the regular season, he earned first team All-American recognition by the Associated Press, CBSSports.com, USA Today, second team recognition by Athlon Sports, and honorable mention recognition by Sports Illustrated.

Career statistics

Professional career

2014 NFL Draft

Chicago Bears
Sutton was drafted by the Chicago Bears with the 82nd overall pick in the third round of the 2014 NFL Draft. He signed a four-year deal on May 15, 2014 which rendered the Bears to be the first team to sign their whole draft class. On September 7, he posted his first tackle in the season opener against the Buffalo Bills. In Week 3 against the New York Jets, he made his first career start while Jeremiah Ratliff was enduring the effects of a concussion.

Sutton suffered an ankle injury in Week 10 of the 2016 season and was placed on injured reserve on November 15, 2016.

On May 11, 2017, Sutton was released by the Bears.

Minnesota Vikings
On May 17, 2017, Sutton signed with the Minnesota Vikings. He was released on September 2, 2017.

San Francisco 49ers
On July 25, 2018, Sutton signed with the San Francisco 49ers. He was released on August 31, 2018.

Arizona Hotshots
On September 14, Sutton was revealed as a new signing for the Arizona Hotshots of the Alliance of American Football for the 2019 season. The league ceased operations in April 2019. Sutton was credited with 15 tackles, a sack, and two pass knockdowns in 8 games.

Seattle Dragons
On October 15, 2019 Sutton was drafted by the XFL to play for the Seattle Dragons. He was named to the mid-season All-XFL team after recording 15 tackles and a sack. He had his contract terminated when the league suspended operations on April 10, 2020.

Notes

External links
Chicago Bears bio
Arizona State bio
Sutton (college) at CBS Sports
Sutton (NFL) at ESPN.com
Sutton at NCAA

1991 births
Living people
Players of American football from California
Sportspeople from Corona, California
American football defensive tackles
All-American college football players
Arizona State Sun Devils football players
Chicago Bears players
Minnesota Vikings players
San Francisco 49ers players
Arizona Hotshots players
Seattle Dragons players